West End Park International Cricket Stadium (official name) or Al-Arabi Stadium or Asian Town Cricket Stadium is a cricket ground in Doha, Qatar. In June 2013, the ground was opened for cricket with opening of the Grand Mall Hypermarket on its premise. The stadium can seat 13,000.

History
West End Park is developed by the Qatar Property Management in collaboration with Sheikh Jassim bin Mohammad bin Thani Social Welfare Foundation. The sports club at West End Park project will also have a football ground, four cricket pitches for practice, four badminton and eight basketball courts.

The project comprises four cinemas, an open-air Amphitheatre with capacity 14,500 seats, children's theme park, restaurants and recreational facilities.

In December 2013, it was announced the hosting of first-ever triangular women's One-day and Twenty20 championship in Qatar in January 2014. Women's international teams from the Pakistan, South Africa and Ireland participated in the seven championship matches. This was the first championship ever to be sanctioned by the International Cricket Council.

In October 2014, it hosted Eid T20 Challenge which was between Asia XI and World XI. Several famous players like Brian Lara, Herschelle Gibbs, Sanath Jayasuriya and Tamim Iqbal took part in the match.

In 2015, the stadium was selected to host 1st edition of Pakistan Super League matches which will be played in February 2016. But it was then declared by PCB that the matches will be played in Dubai and Sharjah thus The stadium could not host its first big tournament yet.

The stadium was selected to host all of the Qatar T10 League matches from 7–16 December 2019.

In January 2022,  Afghanistan used this venue as their home ground for a 3-match ODI series against Netherlands. The series was a part of 2020–2023 ICC Cricket World Cup Super League.

Records

International centuries

ODI centuries
1 ODI century have been scored at the venue.

List of International five-wicket hauls

Twenty-20 Internationals 
The following table summarizes the five-wicket hauls taken in T20Is at this venue.

References

External links
 Cricinfo
 Cricket Archive

Sports venues in Doha
Multi-purpose stadiums in Qatar
Cricket grounds in Qatar
Sports venues completed in 2014
2014 establishments in Qatar